Discworld Noir is a 1999 adventure game developed by Perfect Entertainment and published by GT Interactive. The game is set in Terry Pratchett's satirical Discworld universe, and follows its first and only private investigator as he is given a case leading him into the deadly and occult underbelly of the Discworld's largest city.

The game plays on film noir genre tropes, parodying noir classics such as Casablanca and The Maltese Falcon. Originally released for Microsoft Windows, it was later released for PlayStation by Teeny Weeny Games, the resurrected form of the already insolvent Perfect Entertainment. Pratchett consulted on the story and provided some of the dialogue, being credited for causing "far too much interference."

Gameplay
Discworld Noir is an adventure game. Much of the game takes place in conversation, with the player being able to interrogate people with subjects from Lewton's notebook. When something is mentioned in conversation, a note may be added to the notebook, and the player may ask other characters about items in the notebook. Once a lead is of no further use, it becomes scratched out and unselectable. Part way through the game, Lewton becomes a werewolf. The player may then shift Lewton to werewolf form. Like the previous Discworld games, the PlayStation version of the game supports the PlayStation Mouse.

The game uses a "threaded" structure, in which there are separate "vignettes" that the player may come to at different points. In one case, missing a clue early on in the game will cause a character to give it to the player later.

Story

Premise and setting
The main character is Lewton, the Discworld's first and only private investigator, and former member of the Ankh-Morpork City Watch. His investigation of a brutal murder gets him involved in a sinister plot. The game's story line is a completely original creation, unlike the previous Discworld games, two of which were based on particular novels, and one of which was a mixture of elements from several. It is set in Ankh-Morpork, the largest city on the Discworld. The game features many new characters and locales, which do not appear in the Discworld books. Characters and locales from the books also appear, such as the Unseen University, the Dysk Theatre, Pseudopolis Yard, the City Watch and eccentric inventor Leonard da Quirm. Though Pratchett viewed the games as a "parallel Discworld", Chris Bateman wrote the game attempting to fit it between the events of Feet of Clay and Jingo.

Plot

The game opens on a text narration discussing the origins of the "Tsortean wars", and the disappearance of the Tsortese Falchion. There is then a cutscene of Lewton being chased through the streets pursued by an unseen attacker, eventually being stabbed through the chest with a sword. Lewton begins an off-screen narration on being dead, before recalling how it all started. The game flashes back to Lewton taking a case for a woman named Carlotta, who asks him to find a man named Mundy. As Lewton pursues the case he runs into an old flame, Ilsa, and is told to "find Therma" by a troll named Malachite who has escaped from prison. Lewton finds Mundy but is immediately knocked unconscious. He awakes to find a murdered Mundy and the City Watch, thus ending the game's first act.

Commander Vimes names Lewton as his prime suspect and a suspect for all the Counterweight Killings, a series of ritualistic murders, before letting him go. When Lewton grills the Parrot's owner, he reveals he cut Mundy down and looted his body, handing Lewton a small unusual coin. Once Lewton has the coin, he is ambushed by a dwarf named Al-Khali, who searches him, finds the coin, and takes him to troll criminal Horst. Horst believes Lewton has killed Mundy and found the "Golden Sword", and is willing to offer Lewton a large sum of money should Lewton deliver it to him. Lewton discovers the Parrot's singer, a troll named Sapphire, has suddenly run into a large amount of money. Lewton confronts Sapphire, and after Lewton exposes her cover story she reveals she has been blackmailing Therma. In exchange for Lewton keeping quiet she will arrange a meeting with her for him. At a casino, Lewton foils an assassination attempt on Ilsa and Two-Conkers, a man revealed to be Ilsa's husband from the Agatean Empire, and is allowed to continue looking for why Mundy was killed by Carlotta. After all these events have happened, a note from Sapphire arrives in Lewton's office, revealing the details of the meet-up with Therma and allowing the player to progress further in the game. Lewton decides to bring Malachite along and as they get there, Lewton is again knocked unconscious, and when he wakes up he is being interviewed in a Watch interrogation room and Malachite has been murdered.

Act III starts with Lewton being taught about his new werewolf abilities by Gaspode, a talking dog.

In the fourth and final act, Lewton stands in the middle of the temple after the rubble has settled, and aside from Carlotta, busy tending the wounds of Anu-Anu, all the cultists are either dead or have fled. Lewton begins hunting down the surviving members of the cult, discovering a cult-within-a-cult who deliberately sabotaged the ritual for Nylonathatep. He discovers he needs both the sword and the jewel to stop the creature, and obtains a star map from Two-Conkers leading him to the jewel. Lewton also retrieves the sword from the dead body of a cultist member. Horst ambushes Lewton after he finds the jewel, and uses Ilsa as a hostage to get Lewton to give him the sword. Lewton tracks down Horst and finds him in a heavy argument with Carlotta, about to kill her. Lewton saves Carlotta and kills Horst, but turns her over to the Watch before confronting and defeating Nylonathatep. At the end, Lewton convinces Ilsa to leave with Two-Conkers rather than stay with him.

Tone, style, and allusions

In contrast to the first two more brightly-coloured Discworld games, Noir has been called "grittier, darker and more realistic" in style. The game parodies hardboiled fiction and film noir. Lewton is a classic private detective figure, with an appearance and jacket reminiscent of noir detectives. PC Zone compared the character to Sam Spade and Philip Marlowe as played by Humphrey Bogart. Carlotta, meanwhile, has been frequently called a femme fatale figure. Discworld Noirs background music features heavy use of "discordant" strings and dissonance in order to match the mood of classic film noir, and has pieces in the style of jazz and blues. One song in the game serves as a counterpart to the song "As Time Goes By", used in 1942 film Casablanca.

Later on in the game, Discworld Noir transitions into more dark fantasy and Lovecraftian horror territory. In addition to its noir parodies, the game contains multiple references to the work of H. P. Lovecraft.

Development

Perfect Entertainment had enjoyed a working relationship with Terry Pratchett and the Discworld licence from as early as 1993, collaborating closely to develop their first two Discworld games, Discworld (1995) and Discworld II: Missing Presumed...!? (1996). Discworld Noir was developed for Windows 95 and Windows 98. GT Interactive were chosen as publisher due to their strong US presence, as the first two Discworld games had done relatively poorly in America.

Chris Bateman, who had worked on Discworld II in a non-lead role, originally suggested using Teppic (the protagonist of Pyramids) as a lead character, though Pratchett disliked the idea. Pratchett sent the developers a story outline and the first draft of the script, wanting a detective story set in Ankh-Morpork. The idea for a film noir theme specifically came from the developers. Bateman wrote the ultimate script, which was then edited by Pratchett. The script was the first one Bateman had written for a video game. With each Discworld game Pratchett became less and less involved, in Noir mainly being involved during the beginning and end of development.

The game uses pre-rendered 3D models. Real-time 3D models were infeasible for the period, as the developers needed the characters to have facial expressions and so likely few people would have computers powerful enough to run the game. A full 3D game would have required simplification of the characters. Utilising some 3D, however, allowed them to explore more with shadow and fog. The backgrounds in the game remained 2D.

Most of the voice acting was done by four actors: Rob Brydon, Kate Robbins, Robert Llewelyn, and Nigel Planer. There was one less voice actor in Noir than in Discworld II; however, the heavy amount of dialogue in the game led to more reuse of voice actors in comparison. Audio director Rob Lord also provided additional voices. Robbins, voice actress for every female character in the game, finished her lines in a one-day session. Brydon, who voiced the player character, took a "grueling" week to complete his lines, with the game's main delivery of important information being Lewton's hardboiled monologues. Paul Weir created the soundtrack for the game. Weir studied most of the noir films Discworld Noir drew on.

After the release of Discworld Noir for the PC, Perfect Entertainment folded, leaving them unable to patch the game. The company briefly resurfaced as "Teeny Weeny Games", and under this name the game was ported to the PlayStation. The PlayStation version has a lower resolution to the PC game and, in order to fit the game onto one disc (as opposed to the three discs of the PC version), compresses the game's sound and videos. A port for the Dreamcast was in development, but never released.

As a result of the closure of GT Interactive, the game was never released outside of Europe.

Reception

Discworld Noir received generally positive reviews upon its release. Marek Bronstring, writing for Adventure Gamer, rated Noir 4/5 stars and recommended buying the game. Gordon Barrick gave the game 8/10. PC Zone gave the game a positive review, at the time ranking it as their sixth top adventure game. Just Adventure's Tom Houston rated the game A-. PC Gamer UKs Jonathan Davies gave the game a 74% quality rating. Another reviewer for Just Adventure, Jenny Guenther, gave the game a C+, particularly criticising the game's bugs.

The game's atmosphere was praised. Barrick praised the graphics and music for their part in creating the atmosphere, calling the backgrounds "detailed and beautifully rendered" and the saying the music underscored the game with "originality and style". This praise was echoed by PC Zone, drawing notice to the shadows, lighting and fog, and calling the visuals "the perfect companions to an excellent soundtrack". David Wildgoose, writing for PC PowerPlay, noted the "dark and seedy atmosphere", crediting "enticing visuals and a very cool soundtrack". Guenther liked the music, giving the game's sound an A, but criticised the "broken-record-skipping" effect that seemed to get worse as the game went on. The music and its effect on atmosphere was likewise praised by Houston. Reviewing the French translation of the game, JeuxVideo.com's Kornifex praised the game's effective use of rain and its cinematic quality. A second JeuxVideo.com review, however, criticised the scarcity of music and sound effects, though said what music there was brought "a semblance of atmosphere".

The large amount of dialogue was criticised. PC Zone called the dialogue "generally interesting enough" to watch, but sometimes felt it could be too much. The length of the conversations were one reason Tom Houston lowered the grade for Noirs gameplay to a C, a complaint similarly raised by Guenther, who gave the gameplay a D. Reaction to the humour of the game was similarly mixed. Wildgoose felt the developers "tried too hard to make every character and every situation funny", resulting in jokes that fell flat and a level of humour "only sporadically maintained". Bronstring called the game generally amusing, but felt it "very tiresome" at times where it lasted too long. Rose commented, "the dialogue is suitably authentic and funny in that slightly irritating I-know-it's-funny way that Pratchett writes", while Davies criticised the game for not living up to Pratchett's humour.

Bronstring felt the voices sounded "artificial", placing the blame on either poor editing of the various sound sources or a lack of variety in the four voice actors. Barrick, however, praised the voice actors, feeling that every line came across "convincingly". Guenther found the British attempts to imitate foreign accents funny, but nonetheless praised the voice acting.

Retrospective
In a retrospective review in 2002, Bronstring maintained his original rating of 4/5 stars. A 2011 retrospective by Eurogamer's John Walker called it "surprisingly poorly structured", and noted a lack of puzzles. Walker still admitted a "fondness" for the game, however, comparing it favourably to the company's first two Discworld adventure games, noting a lack of "grating knowing tweeness" and an ability to be genuinely funny. In 2011, Adventure Gamers would go on to place it at number 27 in their "Top 100 All-time Adventure Games" list, giving credit to its innovative notepad mechanism, which would become a common element in adventure games. Walker later listed it at number 20 in "The 25 Best Adventure Games Ever Made", praising the voice cast. PC Gamers Richard Cobbett placed it as 25 in a similar list, commenting "the third Discworld game finally shed its predecessors' fixation with being as much Python as Pratchett". Andy Kelly, also writing for PC Gamer, called it one of the 20 best detective games. Kelly commented: "Its shadowy, rain-soaked setting, Ankh-Morpork, is brilliantly atmospheric, and it manages to both mock film noir and be a loving homage to it."

Dave Gilbert called Discworld Noir one of his favourite adventure games, and called it "one of [his] biggest inspirations". Gilbert would eventually create the "Oz noir" adventure game Emerald City Confidential (2009). Kate Berens and Geoff Howard's The Rough Guide to Videogaming includes Discworld Noir as one of its recommended games. Noting the heavy number of conversations, they felt the game played "more like an interactive novel at times" but praised the dialogue and called Ankh-Morpork "beautifully rendered".

References

External links

1999 video games
Cancelled Dreamcast games
Detective video games
Europe-exclusive video games
GT Interactive games
Mystery adventure games
Neo-noir video games
PlayStation (console) games
Point-and-click adventure games
Single-player video games
Werewolf video games
Video games based on Discworld
Video games developed in the United Kingdom
Video games set on fictional planets
Windows games
Video games about cults